Flying Corps is a 1997 World War I flight simulator developed by Rowan Software and published by Empire Interactive.

Theme
It was one of the most popular flight simulators of its time due to its accurate flight models and graphics, and also the novelty factor of a First World War dog fight simulator. Flying Corps is one of the few flight simulators to have dealt with the First World War - Red Baron, Knights of the Sky and the more arcade-oriented Wings have attempted to do the same, but most companies focus on modern air combat and World War II (usually the Battle of Britain).

Plot
The game is split in four campaigns: The Flying Circus (1917),  Battle of Cambrai 1917, German spring offensive (1918) and Hat In The Ring (1918). Several airplanes are available, including the Sopwith Camel, the Nieuport 28 and the Fokker Dr.I.

Release history
It was reshipped later in 1997 with 3dfx support and a few extras in a package named Flying Corps Gold.

Reception
Flying Corps was a runner-up for Computer Gaming Worlds 1996 "Simulation Game of the Year" award, which ultimately went to Jane's AH-64D Longbow. The editors wrote that Flying Corps "sports perhaps the best flight models ever seen on a prop-based sim; only quirky views and steep performance requirements kept it from the crown." Flying Corps was also a runner-up for Computer Game Entertainments 1996 "Best Simulation Game" prize, which ultimately went to Jane's AH-64D Longbow. The editors called Flying Corps "arguably the best World War I flight simulator in existence."

Flying Corps was named the 14th best computer game ever by PC Gamer UK in 1997. The editors praised its "planes so convincing you can actually taste the corned beef and dry biscuits the pilots probably had to eat".

References

External links

1997 video games
DOS games
Windows games
World War I video games
Video games developed in the United Kingdom
Combat flight simulators
World War I flight simulation video games
Empire Interactive games
Rowan Software games
Multiplayer and single-player video games